is a Japanese voice actor, specialising in anime films.

Filmography

Television animation
 Gantz (2004), Adult Onion Alien
 Romeo × Juliet (2007), Camilo
 Hunter x Hunter (2011), Leol
 One-Punch Man (2015), Beast King
 Drifters (2016), Shimazu Yoshihiro 
 This Art Club Has a Problem! (2016), Takeda
 Re:Zero − Starting Life in Another World (2016), Bordeaux Zellgef
 The Saga of Tanya the Evil (2017), Moritz Paul von Hans
 One Piece (2017), Charlotte Snack, Orlumbus, and Tacos
 Pocket Monsters: Sun & Moon (2019), Mohn
 Isekai Cheat Magician (2019), Dortesheim
 Attack on Titan: The Final Season (2020), Magath
 Peach Boy Riverside (2021), Dog
 Pocket Monsters (2022), Mohn
 Delicious Party Pretty Cure (2022), Matasaburou Asai

Original video animation (OVA)
Detective Conan Magic File 3 "Shinichi and Ran — The Memories from Mahjong pieces and Tanabata (2009), Hasegawa

Animated films
The Empire of Corpses (2015), Seigo Yamazawa
Fairy Tail: Dragon Cry (2017), Zash Caine
The Legend of the Galactic Heroes: Die Neue These Seiran (2019), Otho von Braunschweig

Video games
Mobile Suit Gundam Unicorn (2012)
Assassin's Creed: Brotherhood (2010)
The King of Fighters All Star (2019)
Fullmetal Alchemist Mobile (2022), Alex Louis Armstrong

Dubbing

Live-action
Idris Elba
Thor, Heimdall
Thor: The Dark World, Heimdall
Avengers: Age of Ultron, Heimdall
Bastille Day, Sean Briar
Molly's Game, Charlie Jaffey
Thor: Ragnarok, Heimdall
Avengers: Infinity War, Heimdall
Beast, Dr. Nate Samuels
12 Strong, Chief Warrant Officer Hal Spencer (Michael Shannon)
30 Minutes or Less, King Dwayne (Danny McBride)
Batman Begins, Thomas Wayne (Linus Roache)
Battleship, JPJ XO Mullenaro
Beauty and the Beast, Perducas (Eduardo Noriega)
Big Miracle, Colonel Scott Boyer (Dermot Mulroney)
Bloodline, Danny Rayburn (Ben Mendelsohn)
Brick Mansions, Lino Duppre (David Belle)
Burlesque, Marcus Gerber (Eric Dane)
Diary of a Wimpy Kid, Coach Malone (Andrew McNee)
District 9, Christopher Johnson (Jason Cope)
The Expendables 3, Goran Vata (Robert Davi)
Fences, Lyons Maxson (Russell Hornsby)
The Final Destination, George Lanter (Mykelti Williamson)
Good People, Jack Witkowski (Sam Spruell)
The Good, the Bad, the Weird, Byeong-choon (Yoon Je-moon)
Hobbs & Shaw, Tsoi (Tom Wu)
Houdini & Doyle, Horace Merring (Tim McInnerny)
Ignition, Peter Scanlon (Nicholas Lea)
John Q., Guard Max Conlin (Ethan Suplee)
Kings of South Beach, Enrique (Ricardo Antonio Chavira)
Kite, Detective Prinsloo (Deon Lotz)
The Lucky One, Keith Clayton (Jay R. Ferguson)
Made of Honor, Colin McMurray (Kevin McKidd)
The Onion Movie, Kip Kendall (Scott Klace)
The Passage, Jonas Lear (Henry Ian Cusick)
Quarantine, George Fletcher (Johnathon Schaech)
REC 2, Chief Fernández (Oscar Sánchez Zafra)
The Shallows, Carlos (Óscar Jaenada)
Transformers: Dark of the Moon, Soundwave
Turistas, Finn (Desmond Askew)
USS Indianapolis: Men of Courage, Lt. Adrian Marks (Thomas Jane)
War for the Planet of the Apes, Maurice (Karin Konoval)
Wild, Paul (Thomas Sadoski)

Animation
Cars 2 (Victor Hugo)
Klaus (Mogens)
Mary and Max (Damien Popodopoulos)
Planes: Fire & Rescue (Ryker)

References

External links
 Official profile
 
 

Living people
Japanese male voice actors
1965 births